Carry On Cabby is a 1963 British comedy film, the seventh in the series of 31 Carry On films (1958–1992). Released on 7 November 1963, it was the first to have a screenplay written by Talbot Rothwell (although the first screenplay "Tolly" submitted to Peter Rogers was developed as Carry On Jack) from a story by Dick Hills and Sid Green (script writers for Morecambe and Wise). Regulars Sid James, Hattie Jacques, Kenneth Connor and Charles Hawtrey are all present. Liz Fraser makes her third appearance (and last for more than a decade) and both Bill Owen and Esma Cannon make their final (and in both cases, fourth) appearances. This was the first film in the series to feature Carry On regular Jim Dale, and the first not to feature Kenneth Williams in the cast. Williams turned down the role of Allbright due to what he considered an inferior script. The part was scaled down, and given to Norman Chappell.

Carry On Cabby was originally planned as a non-Carry On film, called Call Me A Cab (after a stage play) but midway through development it became part of the Carry On series. The film is notable from others in the series for its dramatic plotline of a troubled marriage.

Plot

Charlie Hawkins (Sid James) is the workaholic owner of thriving taxi company Speedee Taxis, but his wife Peggy (Hattie Jacques) feels neglected by him because he works long hours. When Charlie misses their fifteenth wedding anniversary because he is out cabbing, after promising Peggy a night out, she decides to punish him. For tax reasons, all the company funds are held in Peggy's name, so she tells Charlie that she is going to 'get a job', then uses the money to establish a rival company, GlamCabs. The cars are brand new Ford Cortina Mk1s driven by attractive girls in provocative uniforms. Flo, the wife of one of Charlie's drivers, is appointed to the post of office manager.

Charlie continues to coach his mainly inept drivers, including the clumsy Terry "Pintpot" Tankard (Charles Hawtrey), whilst Peggy refuses to tell Charlie about her new job. Charlie feigns a lack of interest, but he is dying to know what she is up to, particularly as he gets a taste of his own medicine because she now works long hours. He struggles to cope while Peggy's company becomes a thriving success due to the large number of male taxi passengers preferring to ogle her sexy drivers during journeys. Speedee rapidly starts losing money and faces bankruptcy. Peggy feels terrible for what she has done. Charlie and his drivers attempt to sabotage the rival company, but they are chased off.

In desperation, Charlie suggests a merger with his rivals, but is furious to discover who the real owner is and storms off.

A month later, Peggy is living at the office and Charlie has turned to drink, allowing his company to collapse around him. Peggy and Sally (Liz Fraser) are hijacked by gangsters. Peggy manages to use the taxi radio to subtly reveal their situation and location. Charlie intercepts the broadcast and rallies the other Speedee drivers in pursuit. The outlaws are cornered and captured.

Peggy and Charlie are reconciled, especially over the fact that she is expecting a baby.

Cast

 Sid James as Charlie Hawkins
 Hattie Jacques as Peggy Hawkins
 Charles Hawtrey as Terry "Pintpot" Tankard
 Kenneth Connor as Ted Watson
 Esma Cannon as Flo Sims
 Liz Fraser as Sally
 Bill Owen as Smiley Sims
 Milo O'Shea as Len
 Jim Dale as Expectant father (credited as "Small man" and named "Jeremy" in the film)
 Norman Chappell as Allbright 
 Judith Furse as Battleaxe
 Renée Houston as Molly
 Ambrosine Phillpotts as Aristocratic lady
 Amanda Barrie as Anthea
 Carole Shelley as Dumb driver
 Cyril Chamberlain as Sarge
 Peter Gilmore as Dancy
 Michael Ward as Man in tweeds
 Noel Dyson as District nurse
 Michael Nightingale as Businessman
 Ian Wilson as Clerk
 Peter Byrne as Bridegroom
 Darryl Kavann as Punchy
 Peter Jesson as Car salesman
 Don McCorkindale as Tubby
 Charles Stanley as Geoff
 Marian Collins as Bride
 Frank Forsyth as Chauffeur
 Norman Mitchell as Bespectacled businessman (uncredited)
 Marian Horton as Glamcab driver (uncredited)
 Valerie Van Ost as Glamcab driver (uncredited)

Crew

 Screenplay – Talbot Rothwell
 Idea – SC Green & RM Hills
 Music – Eric Rogers
 Associate Producer – Frank Bevis
 Art Director – Jack Stephens
 Editor – Archie Ludski
 Director of Photography – Alan Hume
 Camera Operator – Godfrey Godar
 Unit Manager – Donald Toms
 Assistant Director – Peter Bolton
 Sound Editor – Arthur Ridout
 Sound Recordists – Bill Daniels & Gordon K McCallum
 Hairdressing – Biddy Chrystal
 Make-up Artists – Geoffrey Rodway & Jim Hydes
 Continuity – Penny Daniels
 Costume Designer – Joan Ellacott
 Producer – Peter Rogers
 Director – Gerald Thomas

Filming and locations

 Filming dates: 25 March – 7 May 1963

Interiors:

 Pinewood Studios, Buckinghamshire

Exteriors:

 The streets of Windsor

The scene in which "Pintpot" (Charles Hawtrey) drives a cab (PEG 1) round and round a roundabout was filmed at the junction of Goswell Road and Arthur Road, Windsor, with the railway arches of Windsor & Eton Central Station visible in the background. This area has changed considerably since 1963 with the building of King Edward Court and Ward Royal. Some filming was also undertaken in Farm Yard opposite Windsor & Eton Riverside Station.

The filming of Carry On Cabby is portrayed in the BBC drama Hattie, a dramatisation of the life of Hattie Jacques.

Release 
First screened to the trade (cinema distributors) on 22 August 1963, the film went on general release across the UK later the same year on 7 November.

See also 
 Taxi! – contemporary TV series with Sid James in a similar role to Carry On Cabby

References

Bibliography

External links

 Carry On Cabby at The Whippit Inn

1963 films
1963 comedy films
British black-and-white films
1960s English-language films
Cabby
Films shot at Pinewood Studios
Films directed by Gerald Thomas
Films produced by Peter Rogers
Films with screenplays by Talbot Rothwell
Films about taxis
1960s British films